The Embassy of Sudan in London is the diplomatic mission of Sudan in the United Kingdom.

In 2013 the embassy was the site of a protest following a crackdown against protestors in Khartoum opposed to cuts in a fuel subsidy.

Gallery

See also
 Sudan–United Kingdom relations

References

External links
Official site

Sudan
Diplomatic missions of Sudan
Sudan–United Kingdom relations
Buildings and structures in the City of Westminster
St James's